Nat Khat (born Soe Moe Naing, 22 October 1990) is a Burmese television actor. He is best known for his role in television series Forever Mandalay (2014), Myittar Athel Mywar (2016), A Yake (2018), Chit Ya Par Thaw Nway (2019) and Kyun Taw A Mone Sone Kyun Taw (2020).

Early life and education
Nat Khat was on October 22, 1990 in Yangon, Myanmar to parents Nyi Nyi Naing and Moe Sabal Myint. He is the second son of three siblings and has two sisters. He graduated from East Yangon University, specialized in Economy.

Career
He started his modelling career from attending at Stars & Models Int'l from 2011 to 2012. He started his acting career from selecting for the new cast by Forever Group. In 2013, he starred in drama series Forever Mandalay alongside Aung Min Khant, Chue Lay, Aung Yay Chan and Myat Thu Thu, aired on MRTV-4, on February 10, 2014. In the same year, he starred in comedy-drama series Flowers & Butterflies alongside Kyi Zaw Htet, Soe Nandar Kyaw, Khay Sett Thwin, Kyaw Hsu and Kyaw Htet.

In 2016, he starred in drama series Myittar Athel Mywar . In the same year, he starred in drama series Better Tomorrow alongside Aung Min Khant, Aung Yay Chan and Chue Lay. In 2018, she starred in drama series A Yake as the character Kyaw Htun Nyo alongside May Myint Mo, Hein Htet, Khay Sett Thwin and Nan Sandar Hla Htun. In 2019, she starred in action-drama series Winkabar Shin Tan alongside Si Thu Win and Nan Sandar Hla Htun. The same year, he starred in drama series Chit Ya Par Thaw Nway as the character Paing Thu alongside Chue Lay.

In 2020, she starred in drama series Kyun Taw A Mone Sone Kyun Taw as the character Soe Naing alongside Nan Sandar Hla Htun and Nay Yee Win Lae.

Filmography
Television seriesFlowers & Butterflies (2013)Forever Mandalay (2014)Myittar Athel Mywar (2016)Better Tomorrow (2016)A Yake (2018)Winkabar Shin Tan (2019)Chit Ya Par Thaw Nway (2019)Kyun Taw A Mone Sone Kyun Taw (2020)Ma Kyay Si'' (2022)

References

External link

Living people
1993 births
Burmese male film actors
21st-century Burmese male actors
People from Yangon